Arthur Boyd Hancock III (born February 22, 1943, in Nashville, Tennessee) is an American owner of Thoroughbred racehorses, the owner of Stone Farm, a 2,000 acre (8 km2) horse breeding operation in Paris, Kentucky, and a composer of Bluegrass music.

Hancock is a member of one of the pre-eminent American horse racing families. His grandfather, Arthur B. Hancock (1875–1957), founded Claiborne Farm, his father, Arthur B. "Bull " Hancock, Jr. (1910–1972), expanded the business to where it is considered the most important breeding farm in the U.S. during the 20th century and whose sales and influence also impacted European racing.
 
After graduating from Vanderbilt University, Hancock moved to the New York City area where he worked as an apprentice under future Hall of Fame trainer Edward A. Neloy. While Hancock's younger brother Seth would eventually take over the running of Claiborne Farm, Hancock built Stone Farm into a respected and successful breeding and racing operation which earned the family its first ever win in the Kentucky Derby. In partnership with one of his longtime clients, Manhattan real estate broker Leone J. Peters, he bred and raced Gato Del Sol who won the 1982 Derby. He and Peters also teamed up to breed Risen Star, winner of the 1988 Preakness and Belmont Stakes.

Through H-G-W Partners, Hancock owned and raced 1989 U.S. Horse of the Year Sunday Silence whose wins included the Kentucky Derby, Preakness Stakes, and Breeders' Cup Classic. Hancock also co-bred the 2000 Kentucky Derby winner Fusaichi Pegasus. He has also raced in partnership Kentucky Oaks winner Goodbye Halo and Blue Grass Stakes / Haskell Invitational Handicap winner Menifee.

A member of The Jockey Club, in September 1996, Hancock was elected to the board of directors of Fasig-Tipton Co.

Hancock is a devotee of Bluegrass music and has written songs which have been recorded by artists such as Grandpa Jones, Willie Nelson and Ray Price.

He lives at Stone Farm in Paris, Kentucky with his wife Staci and their six children.

References

 Arthur Hancock III at the NTRA

1943 births
Living people
Vanderbilt University alumni
Businesspeople from Kentucky
American racehorse owners and breeders
American country songwriters
American male songwriters
People from Nashville, Tennessee
Sportspeople from Kentucky
Arthur B. Hancock
Bluegrass musicians from Kentucky
Songwriters from Kentucky